The 1906 Swarthmore Quakers football team was an American football team that represented Swarthmore College as an independent during the 1906 college football season. The team compiled a 7–2 record. George H. Brooke was the head coach.

Schedule

References

Swarthmore
Swarthmore Garnet Tide football seasons
Swarthmore Quakers football